Cupping may refer to:

Medicine
 an increase in the cup-to-disc ratio in the eye
 cupping artifact in a CT scan

Other
 Cupping therapy, an alternative health practice and pseudoscience 
 Coffee cupping